The Buyo Dam is an embankment dam on the Sassandra River in the Bas-Sassandra district of Côte d'Ivoire.

References

Dams completed in 1980
Energy infrastructure completed in 1980
Buyo
Hydroelectric power stations in Ivory Coast
Buildings and structures in Bas-Sassandra District
1980 establishments in Ivory Coast